The Senyera (meaning "pennon", "standard", "banner", "ensign", or, more generically, "flag" in Catalan) is a vexillological symbol based on the coat of arms of the Crown of Aragon, which consists of four red stripes on a yellow field. This coat of arms, often called bars of Aragon, or simply "the four bars", historically represented the King of the Crown of Aragon.

The senyera pattern is currently in the flag of four Spanish autonomous communities (Aragon, Catalonia, the Balearic Islands and the Valencian Community), and is the flag of the historically Catalan-speaking city of Alghero (Catalan: L'Alguer) in Sardinia. It is also used on the coat of arms of Spain, the coat of arms of Pyrénées-Orientales and of Provence-Alpes-Côte d'Azur, the flag of Roussillon, Capcir, Vallespir and Provence in France, one quarter of the coat of arms of Andorra, and on the local flags of many municipalities belonging to these territories. The Senyera (sometimes together with the flag of Andorra)  is also used informally in Catalonia to represent the Catalan language.

It is also a synonym (in Catalan Senyal Reial or Senyera and old Spanish Señal Real or Señera) for Royal Flag, although the word normally refers to the Aragonese and Catalan flags. Also in Aragonese, it is usually referred to as O Sinyal d'Aragón, i.e. "The Sign of Aragón".

Origin and history

The Senyera is one of the oldest flags in Europe still used in the present. There are several theories advocating either a purely Aragonese or a purely Catalan origin for the symbol.

The Gran Enciclopedia Aragonesa states that its first material undisputed evidence dates back to a royal seal of Alfonso II of Aragon (1159), and that all evidence about a "Catalan" origin is debatable since historically nothing can be accepted other than the concept of "barcelonès", and understanding that as allusive to the House of Barcelona (Counts of Barcelona), and then, nothing referring to the ancient geographical area known as Cathalania, Catalonie (Catalonia) where the County of Barcelona was found.

The Gran Enciclopèdia Catalana (1968) claims that the first appearance of the flag is in the arms of the tomb of Ramon Berenguer II, Count of Barcelona, died in 1082 as well as later in the seals of Ramon Berenguer IV, Count of Barcelona of Barcelona and III of Provence in Provençal (1150) and then in Catalan (1157) documents.

Besides, amongst the ancient manuscripts preserved today in Poblet Monastery is found a carte plegada on son tots los Reys d'Arago e Comtes de Barchinona figurats, a genealogical roll of the Kings of Aragon and Counts of Barcelona commissioned between 1396 and 1400 by King Martin I of Aragon. In the document, the four red stripes on a golden background appears only in the royal images painted of Wilfred the Hairy Count of Barcelona (878–897), Ramon Berenguer IV, Count of Barcelona (1131–1162), King Martin I of Aragon (1356–1410) and King Martin I of Sicily (1390–1409). So it may suggest the Four Red Bars on Golden Background emblem was believed to belong to the House of Barcelona and the Counts of Barcelona in times of the initial dynasty (1164–1410) who ruled the Crown of Aragon.

Furthermore, the Pennon of the Conquest of Valencia is documented as the world's oldest extant flag, dating from 1238, even though the yellow part was originally white, but the red stripes design was the same.

The Government of Catalonia states about its official symbols that it may derive from 11th century or 12th century pre-heraldic symbols and the County of Barcelona's coat of arms, in which the yellow and red bars were vertical, while horizontal in the flag. The dynastic coat of arms became also the one for the lands ruled by the counts. It is thus present in the flags and shields of the territories that once were part of the Crown of Aragon and also in the arms of Andorra, Provence-Côte d'Azur and Sicily among others.

Another version is that the Kings of Aragon used and adopted the colours of the Papal States in their own coat of arms as a public and notorious submission to the Pope, something which the County of Barcelona would have followed shortly after according to this version. The colours for the city of Rome, which in those times was controlled by the Pope, were the same. According to the Encyclopædia Britannica, the flag of the Holy See's Navy from the 12th century on consisted of two vertical red and yellow bands, sometimes bearing the tiara and the keys. According to the Vatican official website, the yellow and red of the flag of the Holy See were two colours traditional of the Roman Senate and People. This ancient flag can still be seen on the Capitoline Hill in Rome, near the Roman Forum. The Papal States changed its colours in 1808 to the present yellow and white, while the City of Rome sticks to the old colours to this day. We can reject this theory based on the works of Geronimo de Blancas, chronicler of the Kingdom of Aragon, 1585. This author reports that Pope Innocent III after crowning the King Pedro II (the Catholic) accepted that Aragon was a tributary kingdom of the Apostolic See. To compensate for this gesture the Pope appointed King Peter II Gonfalonier of the Church and that the Church's banner had the colours of the crown of Aragon.

The Almogavars of the Catalan Company used a royal pennon with the arms of the Kings of Aragon when campaigning in the Byzantine Empire. It was used as ensign of the Aragonese Navy from 1263 to 1516.

The plain version of this was used as official flag of the Autonomous Community of Catalonia during the Second Spanish Republic and since the Spanish transition to democracy. In its plain version, it is also used in the French département of Pyrénées-Orientales (Northern Catalonia), part of the former Principality of Catalonia until 1659. It is also used as the flag of Provence, a distinct region with historic ties to the Counts of Barcelona and the Crown of Aragon.

The blazon of this standard version is Or, four bars Gules.

Modern usage

The senyera pattern is nowadays in the flag of four Spanish autonomous communities: without any change for Catalonia, and, with variations, for the territories of the former kingdoms of the Crown of Aragon: Aragon proper, the Balearic Islands and Valencia (while the latter two are modern interpretations, the Valencian Senyera Coronada does originate back to medieval times). It also forms the basis of various unofficial versions, such as the blue or red estelada used by Catalan independence supporters.

The senyera is also the basis for the coat of arms of Pyrénées-Orientales, the flag of the pays of Roussillon in France, and one quarter of the Coat of arms of Andorra. Dozens of municipalities belonging to these territories base their local flags on the Senyera as well.

Origin legends 
According to a 14th-century legend, the flag dates back from the 9th century, when the four red bars were drawn, as an act of gratitude, on Wilfred I the Hairy's (Count of Barcelona) golden shield by king Charles the Bald's fingers drenched with blood from the Count's war wounds prior to Wilfred's death in 897 during the siege of Barcelona by Lobo ibn Mohammed, the Moorish governor of Lleida. This legend would relate the emblem unambiguously to the Counts of Barcelona title. However, Charles the Bald had died 20 years earlier, in 877. Romantic-driven Catalan nationalists were particularly keen on this legend during the Renaixença, in the 19th century, albeit it has always been recognized and divulged as such even in patriotic circles. 

Another version of this legend cites Louis the Pious as the king drawing the bars during the conquest of Barcelona, in this version drawing them in a golden shield, but Louis died before Guifré was born. Also, Barcelona was conquered long before the events described on the legend. Another medieval variant of the legend features Ramon Berenguer painting the bars with his own blood on a yellow shield, with the yellow field of the shield being the arms of Aragon before his marriage.

Variations 
There are a few variations in the official flags of other territories. For instance, in Aragon an extra coat-of-arms, in Balearic Islands a castle in the canton, and in València a blue crowned fringe on the hoist.

Current official territorial flags

Historical flags

Military

Flags of political movements

See also 
Coat of arms of the Crown of Aragon
Estelada
Flag of Spain
Flag of Valencia
Pennon of the Conquest
Coat of arms of Andorra
Le Perthus Pyramid

References

External links 
 
 Senyera History
butronmaker.blogspot.com Historic images

Crown of Aragon
Flags of Spain
Flags of France
National flags
History of Catalonia
Catalan symbols
Heraldic charges
Flags of indigenous peoples
Aragonese culture

ca:Senyera Reial